Court uniform and dress were required to be worn by those in attendance at the royal court in the 19th and early 20th centuries.

Specifically, court uniform was worn by those holding particular offices associated with the government, the Civil Service, the Royal Household, or similar national institutions. A range of office-holders were entitled to wear it, with different grades of uniform specified for different grades of official. It is still worn today on state occasions by certain dignitaries both in the UK and abroad.

Court dress, on the other hand, is a stylized form of clothing deriving from fashionable eighteenth-century wear, which was directed to be worn at court by those not entitled to a court uniform. For men, it comprised a matching tailcoat and waistcoat, breeches and stockings, lace cuffs and Cravat, cocked hat and a sword. For women, a white or cream evening gown was to be worn, together with a train and other specified accoutrements. Male court dress is still worn today as part of the formal dress of judges and King's Counsel, and is also worn by certain Lord Mayors, parliamentary officials, and high sheriffs of counties. Formerly, female court dress was required wear for debutantes being presented at court, but it ceased to be regularly worn after the Second World War, as afternoon presentations largely replaced evening courts.

Precise descriptions, both of court uniform and of court dress, were laid down in an official publication called Dress Worn at Court, which was published by the Lord Chamberlain's Office. The 1937 edition remains authoritative for those rare circumstances in which court uniform or court dress are still required.

Men's court dress 

Court dress (as distinguished from court uniform) was worn by all men not entitled to court uniform or military uniform on occasions of state where such were customarily worn. Such occasions are now rare, but formerly they included state balls, evening state parties, courts and levées. (Courts were evening occasions at which women were formally presented to the monarch; levées were morning gatherings at which men were presented). It is still worn today, to a very limited extent, in courts of law and by certain parliamentary and other office-holders; the last time it was worn by people in significant numbers was at the Coronation in 1953. It consists of a tail-coat with matching waistcoat and breeches, lace cuffs and jabot, silk stockings, buckled shoes, cocked hat, white gloves and a sword. At one time suits of various colours were to be seen, often with gold or silver embroidery; but (as is generally the case with men's formal dress) black is now the predominant colour, and has been since the nineteenth century.

Origins and development
Peers' robes were worn over normal dress, which gradually became stylised as the court suit. It was only from the late eighteenth century that court dress became fossilised. By the early to mid eighteenth century velvet was largely confined to court dress. Court dress was obligatory in Westminster Abbey for all not wearing official or lordly apparel.

During the seventeenth century, gentlemen's court dress was largely determined by two related influences, the retention of out-dated styles, producing a distinctive form of dress, and an interest in military uniform. The first produced the court suit, a coat with tails, waistcoat and knee breeches, worn with silk stockings, and a formal court sword with a cut-steel hilt and embellishments, and bicorne hat. The court suit has undergone a number of changes since the eighteenth century. However, apart from changes in the cut of the sleeves and shoulders, there was little basic alteration until the third quarter of the nineteenth century.

In the eighteenth century, dress worn at court comprised gold and silver stuff, brocades, velvets and cloth coats. They were always embroidered, and worn with waistcoats generally of a different colour- gold or silver brocade, damask, silk or satin, heavily embroidered or laced in silver or gold. From the 1730s at least cloth was popular for court wear. By the 1780s dress was established as dark cloth or velvet, embroidered in silk or metal, single-breasted silk waistcoat (usually white), with the fronts curved away.

The 19th century
From 1810, the Lord Chamberlain laid down regulations for court dress. In the nineteenth century court dress coats were commonly black, brown, dark green, purple, or blue. Breeches matched, or could be silk of a similar colour. The coat, and sometimes the breeches, were embroidered. The waistcoat was generally white satin, sometimes embroidered. These were worn with white silk stockings, black shoes with shoe buckles, and sword. A wig-bag was found on the back of the neck. A crescent-shaped chapeau-bras, known as an opera-hat, developed in the 1760s–1770s from the three-cornered hat. In the second decade of the nineteenth century, this hat became known simply as the cocked hat. In the 1830s–1840s, the full court dress was sometimes decorated with embroidery, and sometimes not. Cloth was most general, but velvet was also used. For levées, cloth trousers were worn.

A new style of court dress, worn from the 1840s, comprised a dark, frequently black, cloth (or silk-velvet) single-breasted dress coat (lined with black silk, except for the tail, which was white), with a stand collar. This was worn with a white satin or black silk collarless waistcoat, and white neckcloth. For levées, this was worn with matching velvet trousers with a gold lace stripe down the seam. For drawing rooms matching breeches with white silk stockings, and a white neck-cloth was worn.

In 1869, the Lord Chamberlain's Department issued new regulations for gentlemen at Court. The new style of suit was described, in which the cloth coat and breeches were replaced with silk velvet. This had been permitted before, but in place of the embroidered waistcoat was a waistcoat of plain white silk. A coat for levée dress had dark coloured cloth, single-breasted, with a stand collar, and trousers of the same material and colour as the coat, both decorated with narrow gold lace on collar, cuffs and pocket flaps, similar to that worn on certain classes of the civil uniform. A gold lace loop and button were similarly worn on the hat, and a sword of the same pattern carried.

In 1898, court dress was described as black (often very dark blue) velvet, or a dark colour cloth suit (not black). The velvet version in 1898 was without gold embroidery on the coat, and the buttons were gilt, steel or plain. The waistcoat was either black velvet, or the normal white one. Trousers were of velvet. Hats were as for the cloth version, that is beaver or silk cocked hat with black silk cockade, but the loop and buttons were gilt or steel, and there was no lace. The sword was gilt or steel with silk shoulder belt. A white neckcloth was worn. When breeches were worn they were black velvet with black silk hose. Gilt or steel buckled shoes were worn. The velvet suit was all black. The cloth coat in 1898 had embroidery on collar, cuffs and pocket flaps, specified as similar to fifth-class civil uniform, . The buttons were convex gilt with mounted crown in relief. Gold lace striped trousers (for levée dress) or white breeches, black or white silk stockings, gilt buckled shoes, beaver or silk cocked hat with black silk cockade gold lace loop and buttons, sword same as civil, suspended by a silk shoulder belt worn underneath the waistcoat, white neck cloth.

The 20th century: variations on a theme

By the time Dress worn at Court was published, in 1898, regulations for three different varieties of court dress had been laid down: 'old style velvet', 'new style velvet' and 'cloth'. The velvet suits were in black and without embroidery; the cloth court suit ("for Courts and Evening Parties") is to have embroidery, and is to be "mulberry, claret or green - not blue or black". (Legal and judicial cloth Court suits were black.) The most notable difference between the 'old style' and 'new style' suits is that the old style coat has a curved front and is worn with a lace jabot, whereas the new style coat is cut away at the waist and is worn with a white bow tie. In this, it will be seen that the new style is closer to what is nowadays known as 'white tie' or white tie and  tails.

Old style velvet court dress
In 1908, the old-style court suit was of velvet, with a cut-back frock style, single-breasted with seven buttons and button-holes, but the coat was actually fastened edge-to-edge on the chest by a hook and eye. There were six buttons at the back, two extra halfway down the tails. A black silk flash or wig-bag, and lace frill and ruffles were worn. A white satin or black silk waistcoat was worn, which was no longer to be embroidered (and has four small buttons). The breeches were black velvet, with three steel buttons and steel buckles at the knee. Black silk stockings, black patent leather shoes with steel buckles, black silk or beaver hat, steel hilt sword and black scabbard (belt under waistcoat) and white gloves completed the dress. At levées velvet trousers with patent leather military boots were worn.

In 1912, the old style pointed pocket flaps were to have three buttons (one under each point). The waistcoat has pointed pocket flaps and three buttons under each, skirted fronts. The sword is of sling type, with slings instead of a frog on the black silk waistband.

New style velvet court dress

By 1908, the new style court dress was described as being a single-breasted black silk-velvet coat, worn open but with six buttons, a stand collar, gauntlet cuffs, four buttons at back, two at centre waist, two at bottom of tails. It was lined with black silk, except for the tail, which was white. Buttons were cut steel. The waistcoat was white satin or black silk, breeches were black velvet, with three steel buttons and steel buckles at the knee. Black silk stockings, black patent leather shoes with steel buckles, black silk or beaver hat, steel hilt sword and black scabbard, belt under waistcoat, white gloves, and white bow tie completed the dress. At levées velvet trousers with patent leather military boots were worn.

The regulations for 1912 were substantially the same as in 1908. The only difference for the new style was that the pocket flaps were to have the three points on the waist seams, the coat lined with white silk, tails with black lining, trousers were now not allowed at levées. The hat has a steel loop as a black silk cockade or rosette, sword belt a black silk waist belt under the waistcoat, with blue velvet frog. At levées one could wear with the velvet or cloth dress a black or very dark Inverness cape, or a long full dark overcoat.

In 1937, the final edition of Dress Worn at Court was published. The new style velvet court dress included a white satin waistcoat (not white corded silk or marcella), or a new optional black velvet waistcoat. The cocked hat is described as "beaver", silk being omitted. The shirt was to be as worn with evening dress, soft front with stiff white cuffs. Trousers were still prohibited.

Cloth court dress
In 1908, a dark cloth suit was worn for courts and evening parties. This was mulberry, claret, or green, but not black or blue. It was single-breasted, worn open but with six gilt buttons and dummy button-holes. There was a stand collar, gauntlet cuffs, two buttons at back centre waist, and two at bottom of tails. Gold embroidery was on the collar, cuffs, and pocket flaps as for the 5th class. There were matching breeches, gilt buckled, a white corded silk or marcella waistcoat with four small gilt buttons. Stockings, tie, gloves, shoes, and hat were as for the new style, but gilt buckles were added to the shoes, and a gold loop on the hat. The sword was "Court Dress with gilt hilt", in a black scabbard gilt mounted, with gold knot. At levées, trousers were worn instead of breeches, to match the coat, and patent leather military boots.

In 1912 the cloth court dress is still described as embroidered on the collar, cuffs and pocket flaps as for 5th class. Buttons are gilt, convex, mounted with the imperial crown. Matching cloth trousers with rows  gold lace. By 1937 the cloth coat was decorated with gold embroidery similar to the edge of a Privy Counsellor's uniform coat, .

Alternative court dress

In 1924 white-tie evening dress was given official status as an 'Alternative Court Dress' for use on State occasions. (from 1914 to the 1920s, an unofficial style had been used). It comprised black dress coat with silk facings (or revers), white marcella (or the same material as coat) waistcoat, black cloth knee-breeches with three buttons and black strap fastening with black buckle, black silk stockings with plain black court shoes with bows, and white gloves. This was worn with ordinary dress shirt, collar, white bow tie, and opera hat.

This was very similar to the "frock dress" introduced in the mid nineteenth century, and worn at dinners and evening parties when uniform was not worn: frock dress in 1883 comprised dress coat and waistcoat, breeches or pantaloons, white cravat. In 1908 this was described as being dress coat with silk facings, black or white waistcoat, black cloth or stockinette breeches, with three black buttons and buckle at knee, pantaloons not now being allowed. This was worn with plain court shoes with bows, not buckles, and the cravat was replaced by a white tie. A folding cocked hat in corded silk with a black loop and rosette and white gloves finished the dress, which was used for dinners, balls, and receptions. In 1912, the frock dress was the same, except that the hat was now an opera hat. In 1929 and 1937, this was substantially the same, except that a stiff evening dress shirt and a winged collar were added, and opera hat omitted.

In the Army and Navy Stores catalogue of 1939 this dress is described as the "new pattern cloth (alternative) Evening Dress".

Official sanction of 'Frock dress' as an alternative to Court dress coincided with the election of Britain's first Labour government (George V is said to have shown sensitivity to his new government in sartorial matters). Similarly, for the 1937 Coronation, gentlemen were firmly instructed to wear 'full-dress uniform or full velvet Court dress'; but a note in the Gazette reveals that 'Members of the House of Commons may obtain particulars of alternative dress from the Speaker's Secretary' and likewise 'representatives of trade unions and friendly societies may apply for information as to their dress to the Earl Marshal's office'. By the time of the 1953 Coronation, those in procession in the Abbey were instructed to wear full-dress uniform or Court dress; but for other gentlemen a range of dress was permitted: 'one of the forms of Court Dress as laid down in the Lord Chamberlain's Regulations for Dress at Court, or evening dress with knee breeches or trousers, or morning dress, or dark lounge suits.' On both occasions, 'Oriental dress' was also permitted, for those for whom it was 'the usual Ceremonial Costume'.

The 21st century

In the twenty-first century old and new style velvet Court Dress has become the distinctive garb of High Sheriffs (see the external images in the links on the right). Male members of the Royal Family continue to wear 'Alternative Court Dress' (with knee-breeches) for the annual Diplomatic Reception at Buckingham Palace. Varieties of court dress continue to be worn by senior legal professionals, and by certain parliamentary and other officials.

Legal and other variations

Legal court dress

There were slight variations in the velvet and cloth court suits in the case of the judiciary and the legal profession in 1937.

This is worn still by legal persons, mostly by King's Counsel and judges of the superior courts – when sitting in the divisional court and administrative court of the King's Bench division of the High Court, and in the Court of Appeal Criminal Division – and by some parliamentary officials. It is a single-breasted cloth or velvet coat, of cut-away front style, with seven buttons although actually fastened edge-to-edge on the chest by a hook and eye arrangement. There are six buttons at the back, with two extra halfway down the tails. The coat is worn with a waistcoat, breeches to match the coat, black silk stockings, buckled shoes, sling sword, cocked hat, lace frill, ruffles, black silk flash (or wig-bag). They are worn with military boots and trousers for levées.  For daily wear, only the coat and waistcoat are worn, with trousers and shoes.

Full dress for the Lord Chancellor and judges comprises black cloth or velvet court coat, waistcoat, black cloth knee breeches, black silk stockings, shoes and steel buckles, plain bands, white gloves, and a beaver hat. The cloth dress is worn only on such occasions as when attending St Paul's Cathedral in state, the Lord Chancellor's Breakfast, in court on the first day of Michaelmas Law Term, and at the House of Lords when His Majesty The King is personally present, and is worn with robes, wigs and lace bands. On other state and semi-state occasions, ordinary black velvet court dress of the legal style should be worn.

Parliamentary use

The Clerks of both Houses wear short wig and gown over a legal cloth court suit, worn with trousers and white bow tie. At the State Opening and on similar occasions the Clerk of the Parliaments and the Clerk of the House of Commons wear the same dress but with knee-breeches and lace jabot & cuffs. The Clerk of the Crown and their Deputy wear the same dress in most respects, but with bands rather than bow tie.

The Serjeants at Arms wear a cloth court suit of legal pattern with knee-breeches, white gloves and silver-hilted sword. On State occasions they wear lace and a Collar of Esses also. Black Rod is similarly dressed (with, on State occasions, his chain of office rather than the collar) but with black-hilted sword, black leather gloves and black shoe-buckles (rather than silver).

Attendants or messengers in both Houses have, since the nineteenth century, worn a black evening dress suit, black waistcoat, white tie and a silver badge suspended from the neck.

In the House of Commons, the Speaker traditionally wore a black silk gown over a black cloth court suit of legal pattern, knee-breeches, white bands, full-bottomed wig, and carried a three-cornered hat. On state occasions, as when attending on His Majesty together with the House of Commons (such as for the State Opening of Parliament or the presentation of an Address) the Speaker traditionally wore a state robe of black satin damask with gold lace guarding over a black velvet court suit, lace jabot, lace ruffles or cuffs, full-bottomed wig and white gloves, with hat.

For mourning, the Speaker has traditionally worn a black paramatta gown, white 'weepers' (broad linen wraps) on coat cuffs, broad-hemmed frill and ruffles instead of lace, lawn bands, and black buckles on shoes and knees replacing the bright metal ones. This was worn by Sir Lindsay Hoyle in 2022 when the House of Commons sat in the aftermath of the death of Queen Elizabeth II. Others in Court dress wear broad-hemmed frill and ruffles, black buckles and gloves and a black-mounted sword.

The Speaker's Secretary and his train-bearer wear a black cloth court suit of legal pattern, with lace frill and ruffles, steel buckles on breeches and shoes, cocked hat and sword.

The formal dress of the Lord Chancellor was and is almost identical to that traditionally worn by the Speaker of the House of Commons, as is that of the Lord Speaker of the House of Lords.

Clerical court dress
At courts and levées, bishops were directed to wear rochet and chimere; other clergy (and nonconformist ministers) were to wear cassock, gown and scarf. For 'state or full dress dinners, and evening state parties', however, they were to wear a cloth court coat with knee-breeches and buckled shoes. For bishops the coat was purple (and was worn with a half-cassock called an 'apron'). For other clergy, the court coat was black; (deans and archdeacons wore aprons, junior clergy wore a clerical waistcoat). Archbishops of Canterbury continued to wear this form of dress, at state banquets, into the twenty-first century.

Scottish dress

In 1898, a special dress with sword and dirk was allowed for Chiefs and petty Chiefs as a military uniform at court. By 1908, this was extended to Highland gentlemen, and comprised: kilt, sporran, doublet of cloth or velvet, Highland belts, claymore, dirk, long plaid.

By 1912, the qualification was absent and the description was more detailed. It was to comprise:
 black silk velvet full dress doublet
 set of silver Celtic or crested buttons
 superfine tartan full dress kilt
 short trews (if desired)
 full dress tartan hose
 full dress-length shoulder plaid
 full dress white hair sporran, silver-mounted and tassels
 dirk with knife and fork
 sgian dubh (sock knife)
 patent leather shoulder belt, silver-mounted
 waist belt with silver clasp
 silver mounted shoulder brooch
 silver kilt pin
 lace jabot
 one pair buckles for instep of shoes
 one pair small ankle buckles for shoes
 full dress brogues
 Highland claymore.
 Glengarry or Balmoral, crest or ornament
 Cross belt of leather (or metal mounted) for carrying the sword worn over the right shoulder.

By 1937, the shoulder plaid became shoulder plaid or belted plaid. Dress sporran could be hair, fur, or skin, any pattern. Footwear was dress shoes and brogues. Highland Bonnet, feather or feathers if entitled. Highland pistols and powder horn may be worn.

Dress Doublet- of velvet, cloth or tartan. Waistcoat [if doublet is intended to be worn unbuttoned]- velvet, cloth, tartan; dress kilt; dress hose; plaid either shoulder or belted; shoulder brooch for plaid; dress sporran and strap or chain (sealskin, silver furnished top)- can be hair, fur, skin; Highland basket-hilt sword, black leather or metal mounted scabbard; sgian dubh (sock knife); dirk; kilt pin; jabot, lace (lace, silk, satin or lawn stock); cuffs, lace; Ghillie Brogue shoes (leather uppers, soles and tassels) or Dress shoes (with buckle); Highland Bonnet; belt and buckle (leather and lined); flashes; Highland pistols and powder horn may be worn; gloves are not worn.

Women's court dress

For women (as for men) court dress originally meant the best and most opulent style of clothing, as worn in fashionable and royal society. A distinctive style can be seen in the dresses and accoutrements worn by courtly ladies in the Elizabethan period, and likewise in subsequent reigns. The Commonwealth put a stop to Court activity – and to opulent display in general; but with the Restoration, the opportunities afforded by attendance at the royal court was taken up all the more zealously by young women of status or aspiration (and their families).

Fashion (and wealth) continued to dictate what was worn on these occasions; but in the late eighteenth century, a degree of fossilisation began to set in, with the result that women in attendance at royal courts were still, in the early nineteenth century, to be seen in garments with side-hoops, reminiscent of forms of dress fashionable in the mid-1700s. In the 1820s, however, George IV made known his opinion that obsolete side-hooped dresses should no longer be worn; and thereafter fashion began to have more of an impact on the style of dress worn by women at court.

Courtly garments, then, can be seen reflecting something of the contemporary fashions of high society, from the expansive skirts and crinolines of the 1850-60s, through the posterior bustles of the 1870s & 80s, right through to the straight gowns of the 1920s.

Some details of court dress, though, were more or less invariable (and these set court dress apart from more ordinary forms of evening or day wear in any given period). Moreover, from the late eighteenth century, what was worn at court had been subject to a degree of regulation, and this helped standardise certain features. Most noticeably, court dresses (regardless of style) are expected to have a sizeable train (usually separate from the dress itself). Trains were required to be a minimum of three yards in length; in the late 1800s a length of fifteen yards was not unusual.  The dress itself was expected to be long and low-cut (again, whatever the style). The prescribed headwear was also distinctive: ostrich feathers (usually three in number) were to be worn (to be 'mounted as a Prince of Wales plume', according to the instructions given in Dress worn at Court) - a style which had its origin in fashionable eighteenth-century daywear. In addition, a short veil was worn, and/or lace lappets (first seen in the 1660s, and still being worn by some ladies in the 1930s).

By the end of the nineteenth century, the main occasions at which court dresses were worn were those at which debutantes were presented to the Queen. In the twentieth century (especially following the First World War), occasions for full court dress diminished. It was still required wear for ladies attending the 1937 coronation (albeit without trains and veils - and Peeresses were expected to wear tiaras rather than feathers); but in 1953, ladies attending the coronation were directed to wear 'evening dresses or afternoon dresses, with a light veiling falling from the back of the head. Tiaras may be worn ... no hats'. Court presentations continued, except during wartime, but they gradually became less opulent. In the post-war 1940s evening court events were replaced with afternoon presentations (for which afternoon dresses were worn); and with that, the donning of full court dress ceased to be a rite of passage for young women taking their place in society.

Court uniform

Court uniform came into being in the early nineteenth century. Two orders of dress are prescribed: full dress and levée dress. The full-dress uniform consists of a dark blue high-collar jacket with gold oak-leaf embroidery on the chest, cuffs and long tails; white breeches and stockings; and a cocked hat edged with ostrich feathers. Levée dress is less ornate: the jacket is comparatively plain (with embroidery on the cuffs, collar and pockets only), and is worn with dark blue gold-striped trousers instead of breeches. On occasions, trousers are worn with the full-dress jacket; this is sometimes referred to as 'half-dress'. Different grades (or 'classes') of uniform were stipulated for different grades of official; these are described in detail below.

In the United Kingdom, court uniform was formerly worn by various ranks within the Civil and Diplomatic Service, by Privy Counsellors, and by officials of the Royal Household (who were distinguished from other wearers of the uniform by having scarlet, rather than blue, collar and cuffs). Full dress was worn at courts, evening state parties, drawing rooms, state balls, state concerts, etc.; levée dress was worn at levées, and other ceremonies where full dress was not worn. Neither were worn after retirement without special permission.

Origin, development, and detail of the design

In 1820, King George IV introduced a court uniform based on the Windsor uniform, modified by the dress of the Marshal of France. It had a dark blue single-breasted tail coat (or "coatee"), lined with black silk, the stand collar and gauntlet cuffs having scarlet velvet facings, gilt buttons, waistcoat, breeches or trousers. Soon only the Royal Household wore scarlet cloth facings, and all others had black velvet collar and cuffs. Later the facings, collar and cuffs became blue velvet.

Classification

Court uniforms came in five (later six) classes. Which class of uniform was worn depended on the office held by the wearer: the more senior the position, the higher the class of uniform.
In India, for example, in 1921, the Governors of Bengal, Bombay and Madras were entitled to wear the 1st class uniform, the President, Members, Secretary and Chief Engineer of the Railway Board (among others) were entitled to 3rd class uniform, while Under Secretaries to Local Governments (among others) were entitled to 5th class uniform.

The different classes were indicated by different widths of gold oak-leaf embroidery on the coatee: 1st class had , 2nd class had , 3rd class had , 4th class , and 5th class ; (these measurements related to the width of embroidery on the cuffs in both full and levée dress). On the edge of the cuffs, collar and coatee, the embroidery had a wavy edging for 1st class, and saw edge for lower classes.

Full dress and levée dress
For each class of uniform, both a 'full dress' version and a 'levée dress' version were stipulated; which was worn depended on the occasion.

In full dress the coatee's chest, back, tails back and front, collar, cuffs and pocket flaps were all decorated with gold oak-leaf embroidery. It was fastened by hooks and eyes, with dummy buttons bearing the Royal coat of arms of the United Kingdom (nine buttons up the front, showing between the two embroidered edges two at the waist behind, two at the bottom of back skirts). The coatee had white silk linings, and was worn with white breeches, white gloves, and patent leather court shoes with gilt buckles. The sword had black scabbard, gilt mountings, and sword knot of gold lace strap with bullion tassel; it was worn on a sword belt of white web, with white cloth frog.

The coatee was fastened with practical buttons bearing the Crown onto button-holes. White gloves were again worn, while patent leather military boots replaced the buckled shoes, and the sword accessories were similar to that on full dress, but with blue cloth frog.

Separate full-dress and levee-dress coatees were only provided for the higher grades of official (those holding 1st, 2nd or 3rd class Household positions, or 1st or 2nd class Civil Service positions); lower-grade officials (those holding 4th or 5th class Household, or 3rd, 4th or 5th class Civil Service positions) were only entitled to a levée dress coatee; this was worn for both full dress and levée dress occasions (with breeches worn for full dress, trousers for levée dress).

Accoutrements

Both types of dress were worn with black beaver cocked hat, with black silk cockade; for the 1st class it had white ostrich feather border, as well as treble gold bullion loop and tassels. The 2nd class was as above, but with double gold bullion loop and tassels. The 3rd, 4th, 5th class had black ostrich feather border, plaited gold bullion loops, and no tassels.

In addition, a scarlet lined blue cloth cloak, double breasted, black velvet collar and two rows of six buttons each, with a detachable cape, was described in 1898 for outdoor wear, with a soft cloth forage cap (military staff shape), with a blue peak and scarlet welts around the crown and gold braid on top for the Household, and gold braid without scarlet welt in the case of other officials. The cap for consular use had silver instead of gold braid. A greatcoat as an alternative to the cloak was available in 1912.

In 1908, white gloves were still mentioned in the regulations, while in 1912 they were not, and the 1937 regulation said that they are not worn.

20th-century changes
A sixth uniform, which was classified as the 1st class of civil uniform, was introduced after the First World War, that of Privy Counsellors.

The gold oak lace stripe for Privy Counsellors trousers measured , as did 1st and 2nd classes. The trouser stripes of the 3rd class remained , but that of 4th and 5th was now .

For Privy Counsellors, on both levée and full dress coatees, the embroidery had a purl edging; the cocked hat was similar to that of the 1st class, but with additional hangers on the gold tassels. From the early 20th century the Privy Counsellors, 1st and 2nd classes' levée coatee embroidery was extended to include the centre back waist as well as the collar, cuffs and pocket flaps.

Cabinet ministers, being Privy Counsellors, are entitled to wear the 1st Class civil uniform and continue to be so entitled after they leave Cabinet.

Edward VII ordered Privy Counsellors to wear civil uniform at Privy Council meetings, but this requirement has lapsed. In lieu of Civil Uniform or Court Dress, alternative dress may be worn by gentlemen (except for Household, Diplomatics and Consular Services) on all occasions when uniform or court dress is prescribed.

21st century
By the end of the 20th century the use of this uniform had greatly diminished. Within Her Majesty's Diplomatic Service ambassadors retain a simplified version for wear on such occasions as the presentation of credentials and then only when accredited to certain countries. Until about 1965 Foreign Office Regulations and Consular Instructions had required even junior foreign service officers to acquire this formal dress following completion of their probation period. The Governors of the few remaining colonial territories were notified in 2004 that the expense of providing uniforms would no longer be a recognised charge against the Foreign and Commonwealth Office. In the UK, Court uniform is still worn by a few select officials on formal State occasions (such as at the State Opening of Parliament); but the last time it was worn by people in significant numbers was at the Coronation of Queen Elizabeth II.

Breeches, stockings and court shoes are now confined to coronations so trousers of the levee version are worn instead with full dress.

Great Officers of State

The Lord Great Chamberlain wears a unique form of Court uniform, his coatee being scarlet (with scarlet facings) rather than blue. The Earl Marshal's coatee is also scarlet, with dark blue collar and cuffs. The Earl Marshal's officers (i.e. the Pursuivants, Heralds and Kings of Arms) wear similar coatees with varying degrees of embroidery. All the aforementioned continue to wear the uniform at the State Opening of Parliament and on other occasions, the officers of arms wearing it under their tabards.

Foreign Service variants

Members of the Diplomatic Service wore Court Uniform: ambassadors' coats wore 1st class civil uniform, but with additional embroidery on the sleeves and back seams. High commissioners for Dominions in London wore 1st class uniform. The High Commissioner for Southern Rhodesia, and Agents-General for Australian states, wore 2nd class uniform. The King's or Queen's Foreign Service Messengers were entitled to 5th class court uniform (upgraded to 4th class in 1929) and also wore a distinctive greyhound badge.

Members of the Consular Service wore a slightly different form of the uniform, with silver embroidery rather than gold predominating. The coatee (for both full-dress and levée dress) was in blue cloth, with a Prussian collar, single-breasted buttoning with nine frosted gilt buttons of royal arms, two more buttons on back waist, two more on coat tails. Consuls-general and consuls had embroidered gold and silver lace on collar, cuffs, pocket flaps, and back. Consuls-general had , consuls . Vice-consuls  on cuffs, and front half of collar only. All wore white breeches and stockings, patent leather court shoes with gilt buckles for full dress, or trousers with silver lace stripes and patent leather military boots for levée dress. These were worn with black beaver cocked hats, black cockade, silver bullion loops, and gold tassels. For consuls-general there were treble loops and a border of black ostrich feathers, for consuls double loops, and for vice-consuls single loops. A blue greatcoat or cloak, blue detachable cape was for outdoors use. The sword accessories were the same as for standard court uniform.

Members of the Colonial Service wore Court Uniform (or military uniform, if so entitled); but Governors, and Governors General have distinctive uniform of their own: a plain blue coat, scarlet collar and cuffs (embroidered in silver), silver epaulettes and trimmings and a plumed hat (with Governors General wearing aiguillettes in addition). This uniform (in slightly simplified form) continues to be worn by Governors of British Overseas Territories. Lieutenant-Governors and other officials of various ranks wear regular Court Uniform, as detailed above.

Indian members of the Indian Civil Service were entitled to civil uniform, with a turban or pagri replacing the cocked hat, or the national dress which they were accustomed to wear on ceremonial occasions. They could also wear a blue coat buttoning from the neck to below the waist, worn with white trousers or pyjamas and the native head-dress.

Tropical dress
For all the above, a simplified white uniform was provided for use in tropical postings: of white drill with gilt buttons. Members of the diplomatic and consular services had the same embroidery on the collar and cuffs as on the full-dress blue coatee, but worked on (detachable) white cloth panels. Members of the colonial service, on the other hand, wore dark blue gorget patches with gold braid, which varied according to rank (as did the number of buttons on the cuff).

With this uniform the same cocked hat was worn as with the temperate uniform, or else (specifically 'out of doors during the day') a white sun helmet would be worn; in full-dress, the helmet would have a spike attached (for members of the diplomatic and consular services) or (for governors and governors general) a plume.

See also
 Choir dress
 Dress uniform
 Ghillies
 Mess dress
 Sumptuary law
 Windsor uniform
 Nationella dräkten

Notes

Sources
Dress Worn at Court , published by the Lord Chamberlain's Office, provides official regulations for all details of Court Dress and Uniforms. The 1937 edition has not been superseded.
Dressed to Rule: Royal and Court Costume from Louis XIV to Elizabeth II by Philip Mansel, London: Yale University Press, 2005, .

External links
 
 CUH&GS: Dress and Insignia Worn at Court, 1937, accessed 4 February 2006. Citing Titman, G.A. (1937): Dress and Insignia Worn at His Majesty's Court. Harrison and Sons Limited.

1810s fashion
1820s fashion
19th-century fashion
20th-century fashion
British uniforms
History of clothing (Western fashion)
State ritual and ceremonies
19th century in the United Kingdom
Court uniforms and dress
Material culture of royal courts